Donald Ward Penn (born April 27, 1983) is a former American football offensive tackle. He played college football at Utah State, and was signed by the Minnesota Vikings as an undrafted free agent in 2006. Penn has also played for the Tampa Bay Buccaneers, Oakland Raiders, and Washington Redskins.

Early years
Penn attended St. Anthony of Padua, Gardena, and graduated to Saint Bernard Catholic High School in Playa del Rey, California. He was a student and a letterman in football and basketball. In football, as a senior, he was named the Team's Lineman of the Year, was a first-team All-League selection, and was a first-team All-California Interscholastic Federation selection. As a junior, he was a second-team All-League selection. In basketball, he was an All-State selection. Penn graduated from Saint Bernard Catholic High School in 2001.  He attended Utah State in college, and he notably never allowed a sack throughout his college career.

Professional career

Tampa Bay Buccaneers

Penn was signed by Tampa Bay after he was released from the Minnesota Vikings in 2006. Later in the season in a game against the Miami Dolphins, Penn blocked an extra point attempt. On April 10, 2009, he signed a one-year $2.792 million contract to stay with the Buccaneers. On July 30, 2010, Penn signed a six-year $43 million contract. Penn scored his first ever touchdown in the NFL on November 21, 2010 against the San Francisco 49ers. It came on a one-yard pass from Josh Freeman to put the Buccaneers up 21-0 in the 4th quarter. Penn was named to the 2011 Pro Bowl as an alternate. He replaced Green Bay Packers tackle Chad Clifton, whose team advanced to Super Bowl XLV. On November 11, 2013, Penn scored his second career touchdown against the Miami Dolphins, which was also his 100th consecutive game started. Penn was released on March 13, 2014.

Oakland Raiders

Penn was signed by the Oakland Raiders on March 18, 2014 to a two-year, $9.6 million contract with $4.2 million guaranteed. As an eligible offensive lineman, Penn scored his third career touchdown on a pass from Derek Carr against the San Francisco 49ers, this being the second time he scored against that team.

The Raiders re-signed Penn to a two-year, $14 million contract on March 16, 2016. Penn was named to his second Pro Bowl in 2016 along with fellow Raiders offensive linemen Kelechi Osemele and Rodney Hudson.

On September 15, 2017, Penn signed a two-year, $21 million contract extension with the Raiders. On December 18, 2017, Penn's season was finished after revealing that he would undergo foot surgery. He was placed on injured reserve on December 22, 2017. He was named to his third Pro Bowl but because of his foot surgery, could not participate.

In 2018, the Raiders drafted Kolton Miller in the first round of the 2018 NFL Draft with the intention of being their future left tackle. At the end of training camp, Penn was moved to right tackle after Miller won the starting left tackle job. On October 3, 2018, Penn was placed on injured reserve after suffering a groin injury in Week 4. Penn was released on March 16, 2019.

Washington Redskins

On July 31, 2019, Penn signed a one-year deal with the Washington Redskins. The Redskins chose not to re-sign Penn for the 2020 NFL season and Penn became a free agent.

Retirement
On March 15, 2021, Penn signed a one-day contract with the Las Vegas Raiders, to retire as a member of the team.

Personal life
Penn married his wife, Dominique, in June 2012. They have two sons, Donald III and Dominick, and 1 daughter, Demi. Donald also have a daughter Dylan after an affair with Camilla Pointdexter  Donald and his wife host annual book-bag and Christmas shopping events for youth at the East Oakland Youth Development Center.

References

External links

Utah State Aggies bio

1983 births
Living people
American football offensive tackles
Minnesota Vikings players
National Conference Pro Bowl players
Oakland Raiders players
Players of American football from Los Angeles
Tampa Bay Buccaneers players
Washington Redskins players
Utah State Aggies football players
American Conference Pro Bowl players